The Klettgau Formation is a geological formation in Switzerland. It is Late Triassic in age, covering most of the mid to late Norian, the Carnian, and into the Rhaetian, spanning a period of 26-30 million years.

Description 
The primary depositional environment was that of a playa with marine and fluvial intercalations. The lithology is quite variable consisting primarily of fine grained rocks typically claystones and dolocretes, often with sandstone or carbonatic fluvial channel fills.

Fossil content 
Dinosaur fossils are known from the formation, including those of Plateosaurus, Notatesseraeraptor frickensis and Schleitheimia

The following other fossils were found in the formation:
Prozostrodontia
 Hallautherium schalchi
 Helvetiodon schutzi
 ?Thomasia sp.
 cf. Thomasia sp.
 Thomasia antiqua
 T. moorei
 Tricuspes cf. tuebingensis
 ?Haramiyidae indet.
Morganucodon peyeri
Morganucodon sp.

Reptiles
 Deltadectes elvetica
 Termatosaurus albertii
 Proganochelys quenstedtii
 Paleollanosaurus sp.
 ?Variodens sp.
 cf. Diphydontosaurus sp.
 cf. Eudimorphodon sp.
 Archosauriformes indet.
 Nothosauridae indet.
 Pterosauria indet.
 Sphenodontia indet.
 Theropoda indet.

Amphibians
 Labyrinthodontia indet.

Fish

 Ceratodus parvus
 Sargodon tomicus
 Dapedium sp.
 Hybodus sp.
 Osteichthyes indet.

Invertebrates

 Crinoidea indet.
 Echinodermata indet.
 Mollusca indet.

References

Bibliography 

 
   
     
 
   
 
 
 
 
 

Geologic formations of Switzerland
Triassic System of Europe
Triassic Switzerland
Carnian Stage
Norian Stage
Rhaetian Stage
Marl formations
Mudstone formations
Conglomerate formations
Dolomite formations
Shallow marine deposits
Paleontology in Switzerland